Hudavend Hatun Türbe or Huvand Hatun Türbe is a 14th-century Seljuk Kümbet in Nigde, Turkey.

Architecture
It was built as a Türbe (tomb) for Hudavend Hatun, the daughter of Kilij Arslan IV in 1312.
It was restored by the General Directorate of Religious Endowments (Vakiflar Genel Mudurlugu) in 1962. The tomb is made of yellow cut stone and is covered by a dome topped with a sixteen-sided pyramidal roof on an octagonal body. Total height is 15,5 metres.  White marble was used in the lintels, the arches, the inscription plaques, and the cornice of the dome. The tomb is most known for its elaborate vegetal and zoomorphic carvings.

Gallery

Online pictures
 Over 40 pictures
Closer picture from the building 
Picture of the stone carvings 
Picture of the stone carvings of the portal

References

Buildings and structures completed in 1312
Seljuk architecture
Niğde
Tombs in Turkey
Buildings and structures in Niğde Province